The National Security Act of 1947 (Pub.L. 80-253, 61 Stat. 495, enacted July 26, 1947) was a law enacting major restructuring of the United States government's military and intelligence agencies following World War II. The majority of the provisions of the act took effect on September 18, 1947, the day after the Senate confirmed James Forrestal as the first secretary of defense.

The act merged the Department of the Army (renamed from the Department of War), the Department of the Navy, and the newly established Department of the Air Force (DAF) into the National Military Establishment (NME). The act also created the position of the secretary of defense as the head of the NME It established the United States Air Force under the DAF, which worked to separate the Army Air Forces into its own service. It also protected the Marine Corps as an independent service under the Department of the Navy. Aside from the unification of the three military departments, the act established the National Security Council and the Central Intelligence Agency, the latter of which is headed by the Director of Central Intelligence. 

The legislation was a result of efforts by Harry S. Truman beginning in 1944. President Truman proposed the legislation to Congress on February 26, 1947. The bill was introduced in the U.S. House of Representatives on February 28, 1947, and in the Senate on March 3, 1947. Senator Chan Gurney was the bill's sponsor. Senator Gurney, as chairman of the Senate Committee on Armed Services, led committee hearings for the bill from mid-March to early May. The bill passed in the Senate on July 9, 1947, and in the House on July 19, 1947. The Senate agreed to a related House resolution (80 H.Con.Res. 70) on July 16, 1947. The bill received bipartisan support and was passed in both chambers by voice vote. The National Security Act of 1947 was signed into law by President Truman on July 26, 1947, while aboard his VC-54C presidential aircraft Sacred Cow.

Background 
Before World War II, congressional committees oversaw the Cabinet-level War Department and Navy Department, and while each department was separate from the other, both were able to obtain aircraft. During this time, the President had a level of authority over the departments. After the attack on Pearl Harbor, Congress passed the First War Powers Act, which authorized the sitting president "to make such redistribution of functions among executive agencies as he may deem necessary" provided that it is "only in matters relating to the conduct of the present war" and that these authorities will expire "six months after the termination of the war." 

During World War II, then-chief of staff of the Army George Marshall brought the idea of unification of the armed services to President Franklin D. Roosevelt, but "he was routinely rebuffed on the grounds that a substantive discussion of this option while the country was at war might undermine the war effort." On August 26, 1944, future president Harry S. Truman, who was a senator at the time, wrote that "under such a set-up [of unification] another Pearl Harbor will not have to be feared" in his article "Our Armed Forces Must Be United". Military problems apparent during World War II that turned attention to the need for unification were a lack of preparedness, a lack of attention to "logistics in war," and a "lack of coordination among the services." 

In the years following the war, President Truman had been pushing for the unification of the armed services until the passing of the National Security Act of 1947, having research conducted on the topic since 1944 and having expressed his desire for Congress to act on the issue as early as April 6, 1946. He stated in a letter to Congress on June 15, 1946, that he "consider[s] it vital that we have a unified force for our national defense." President Truman had worked closely with the Army and the Navy to establish a consensus, but the departments struggled to come to an agreement until 1947.

Legislative history 
On February 26, 1947, President Harry S. Truman sent a bill proposal to Congress detailing the creation of a "National Defense Establishment". Representative Clare E. Hoffman (R-MI) introduced the bill as H.R. 2319 to the House of Representatives on February 28, 1947; it was then referred to the Committee on Expenditures in the Executive Departments.

Senator Chan Gurney (R-SD) introduced the bill to the Senate as S. 758 on March 3, 1947. Due to conflict over which committee the bill was to be referred to, as well as the focus the Senate had on the legislative budget at the time, the bill was not able to be introduced in the Senate sooner.

Congressional hearings 
On March 18, 1947, then-Chairman Senator Gurney held congressional hearings in the Senate Committee on Armed Services on the bill that would become the National Security Act of 1947. The hearings were held in three parts: Part 1 hearings were held on March 18, March 20, March 25, March 26, and April 1–3, 1947; Part 2 hearings were held on April 8, April 9, April 15, April 18, April 22, April 24, and April 25, 1947; and Part 3 hearings were held on April 30, May 2, May 6, May 7, and May 9, 1947.

The witnesses at the hearings largely spoke in support of the bill, either overall or with adjustments. Major witnesses of the bill who spoke in support were United States Army Chief of Staff General Dwight D. Eisenhower, Secretary of the Navy James V. Forrestal, Secretary of War Robert P. Patterson, Chief of Naval Operations Admiral Chester W. Nimitz, Under Secretary of War Kenneth C. Royall, Representative Walter G. Andrews (R-NY), Senator Henry Cabot Lodge (R-MA), two colonels from the Reserve Officers Association of the United States, Director of Central Intelligence Hoyt S. Vandenberg, Director of the Bureau of the Budget James E. Webb, and president of General Electric Co. Charles E. Wilson. Assistant Secretary of the Navy W. John Kenney spoke in support but expressed concerns about appropriations, while United States Army Surgeon General Norman T. Kirk expressed concern about the role of medical services. Former Senator Thomas C. Hart (R-CT) opposed the bill and proposed changes to the areas concerning the Navy and the Marine Corps. The president of the Marine Reserve Officers Association, Melvin J. Maas, stated that 95% of the Association opposes the bill and requests adjustments as it comes to the Marine Corps’ role. The president of the Reserve Officers of the Naval Services (RONS), John P. Bracken, stated that the organization opposed the bill due to the lack of input they were allowed to give. Representatives from the National Guard Association opposed the bill as it stood and said that the role of the National Guard needed to be improved.

Debates 
On July 7, 1947, the National Security Act of 1947 was debated for the first time in the Senate, two days after the Senate Committee on Armed Services reported the bill to the Senate. On July 9, 1947, the Senate continued debates and, with an amendment to the title, passed the bill by a voice vote.

On July 15, 1947, having already been passed in the Senate, the National Security Act of 1947 was debated in the House of Representatives. The House introduced Resolution 80 H.Con.Res. 70 on the same day. The Senate agreed to the Resolution on July 16, 1947. The House debated and passed the National Security Act of 1947, along with 80 H.R. 4214, on July 19, 1947. The conference report 80 H. rp. 1051 was agreed to in the Senate on July 24, 1947, and was agreed to in the House on July 25, 1947. The recorded votes on the bill itself "drew strong bipartisan support."

Senate 
During the July 7, 1947, and July 9, 1947, debates in the Senate, members of the Senate Committee on Armed Services spoke the most, with major proponents being Senators Lodge (R-MA), Saltonstall (R-MA), Baldwin (R-CT), Morse (R-OR), Tydings (D-MD), Maybank (D-SC), and Hill (D-AL). Arguments in support of the bill included Senator Gurney's reasoning that there were "personnel problems in the Army and Navy, including the Air Forces" and that "the unification bill is a sincere and earnest attempt to put into effect by legislation a security organization which is adequate, effective, modern – and yet economical."

Senator Robertson (R-WY) was a staunch opponent of the bill, arguing that the bill would cost the country too much considering it would not be able to make the armed services any more efficient, and that the secretary of defense would have too much power.

Senator Robertson offered three amendments during debates, all of which were defeated by voice vote. Senator McCarthy (R-WI) offered an amendment that stipulated that the "existing status of Marine Corps and Naval Aviation not to be altered or diminished; their existing functions not to be transferred to other services"; the Senate debated this amendment the most until it was defeated by a 52-19 roll call vote. The only amendment that passed (by voice vote) in the Senate was offered by Senator Taft (R-OH) in which the National Security Council was to only be focused on national security matters.

House of Representatives 
During the July 15, 1947, and July 19, 1947, debates in the House of Representatives, major proponents of the National Security Act of 1947 included Representatives Wadsworth (R-NY), McCormack (D-MA), and Manasco (D-AL), who were all on the Expenditures Committee as high-ranking members, and the House Armed Services Committee Chairman Walter G. Andrews (R-NY).

Opponents of the bill in the House included Representatives Cole (R-NY), Sheppard (D-CA), Rogers (R-MA), and Taber (R-NY). Representatives Cole, Sheppard, and Rogers argued that the Navy did not have enough protections under the bill, while Representative Taber argued against the budgetary aspect.

Minor amendments were passed during debates in the House. Some of Representative Cole's amendments protecting the Navy and limiting the Secretary of Defense's powers were passed by voice vote (though others he offered were defeated). Representatives Judd (R-MN) and Brown (R-OH) were able to pass amendments by voice votes that required the Director of Central Intelligence to be appointed by the president from civilian life and confirmed by the Senate, and Representative Judd passed an amendment allowing the Federal Bureau of Investigation and the Atomic Energy Commission to conduct secret operations without the inspection of the Director of Central Intelligence. Amendments offered by Representatives MacKinnon (R-MN), Case (R-NJ), Mitchell (R-IN), Clason (R-MA), and Owens (R-IL) were defeated.

Enactment 
The National Security Act of 1947 was signed into law by President Truman on July 26, 1947. The bill signing took place aboard Truman's VC-54C presidential aircraft Sacred Cow, the first aircraft used for the role of Air Force One. The president was traveling to be at the bedside of his dying mother and delayed his departure until the bill was signed.

The majority of the provisions of the act took effect on September 18, 1947, the day after the Senate confirmed James Forrestal as the first secretary of defense. His power was initially limited and it was difficult for him to exercise the authority to make his office effective. This was later changed in the amendment to the act in 1949, creating what was to be the Department of Defense.

Provisions 
The legislation's definition of covert action was vague, limiting oversight over the CIA's activities. It was only in the 1990s that Congress attempted to regulate covert action by prohibiting certain forms of it and enacting substantive and procedural rules for covert action.

Title I – Coordination for National Security 
Title I worked to establish the National Security Council, an advisory council to the president for matters relating to national security in the realm of "domestic, foreign, and military policies" with the intent of allowing for the military departments to communicate with more efficiency. It also established the Central Intelligence Agency (CIA) under the National Security Council, led by the Director of Central Intelligence. The role of the Director of Central Intelligence, and the CIA as a whole, is as an advisory unit to the National Security Council and as a coordinator of intelligence. Finally, Title I worked to establish the National Security Resources Board, an advisory board to the President on matters relating to "the coordination of military, industrial, and civilian mobilization."

Title II – The National Military Establishment 
Outlined the establishment of the National Military Establishment (NME), which consists of the Department of the Army, the Department of the Navy, and the Department of the Air Force (DAF) and is led by the secretary of defense.

Designated the Department of War to be renamed the Department of the Army, led by the secretary of the Army. 

Established the Department of the Navy and outlined it to consist of the United States Marine Corps, the United States Navy, and the United States Coast Guard. The role of the United States Marine Corps was further outlined.

Established the DAF, led by the secretary of the Air Force, and allowed the secretary of defense to designate any and all functions that they deem fit to be under the DAF. 

Created the United States Air Force as an agency of aviation offense and defense under the DAF, led by a Chief of Staff, United States Air Force, who in turn is directed by the Secretary of the Air Force. The Chief of Staff, United States Air Force, was designated as having equal authority as the Chief of Staff, United States Army, and the Chief of Naval Operations.

Established the War Council as an advisory council to the Secretary of Defense within the NME. The War Council consists of the Secretary of Defense, the Secretaries of the Army, the Navy, and the Air Force, the Chief of Naval Operations, and the Chiefs of Staff of the United States Army and the United States Air Force.

Title II established the Joint Chiefs of Staff within the NME as consisting "of the Chief of Staff, United States Army; the Chief of Naval Operations; the Chief of Staff, United States Air Force; and the Chief of Staff to the Commander in Chief, if there be one" with the role of being "the principal military advisers to the President and the Secretary of Defense." It also created a Joint Staff under the Joint Chiefs of Staff.

Created a Munitions Board within the NBE, which replaced the Joint Army and Navy Munitions Board, led by a Chairman and consisted of under secretaries or assistant secretaries from the Department of the Army, the Department of the Navy, and the Department of the Air Force.

Established a Research and Development Board within the NME, which replaces the Joint Research and Development Board, and that consists of a Chairman with two representatives from each military department. The Research and Development Board acts as an advisory unit on matters relating to and the conducting of military research.

Title III – Miscellaneous 
Designated compensation for each of the positions created under the act, designate relative classification statuses, and specify the transfer of funds and resources. 

Defined "function" as including "functions, powers, and duties", and defines "budget program" as "recommendations as to the apportionment, to the allocation and to the review of allotments of appropriated funds".

Specified separability and established the timeline of when provisions of the act would be in effect.

Amended the July 18, 1947, Presidential Succession Act to remove "Secretary of the Navy" and to replace "Secretary of War" with "Secretary of Defense".

Gallery

See also
 Goldwater–Nichols Act

References

Further reading

External links
 National Security Act of 1947 as amended (PDF/details) in the GPO Statute Compilations collection
 Information at the Department of State
 Bibliography of sources relating to the act, including many links to online, public-domain sources
 

United States National Security Council
1947 in American law
United States federal defense and national security legislation
American intelligence gathering law
80th United States Congress
Military reforms